Newcastle Land District is one of 59 land districts of British Columbia, Canada, which are the underlying cadastral divisions of that province. It is located on the southeast side of Vancouver Island.

See also
List of Land Districts of British Columbia

References

 
Land districts of British Columbia